BlackBerry Limited, formerly Research in Motion (RIM), is a Canadian multinational communications corporation, founded in 1995. It is headquartered in Waterloo, Ontario.

Acquisitions

References
General

Specific
In February 2005, RIM secretly acquired a software company in order to ensure that a new technology on how to author and then how to distribute mobile applications could be brought to market without encroaching on Nextair's solid patents. The company signs a deal with Nextair's CEO to keep them confidential, and RIM convinces Nextair to accept.  Proof of Acquisition  https://www.blackberrycentral.com/news/article/interview-tim-neil/

External links
Research In Motion Ltd.

Blackberry
Mergers and acquisitions